Ana Arce (born 5 January 1964) is a photographer and former skip of the Andorran national women's curling team. She now plays on the Spanish national team.

Photography
She produced the Ana Arce Team Sponsorship Calendar 2006 featuring nude or semi-nude photographs of women curlers from a variety of countries including Denmark, Italy, Spain, England, Poland, Germany and Canada. The curlers included Daniela Jentsch, Melanie Robillard, Lynsay Ryan, Kasia Selwand and Claudia Toth. She produced a second calendar for 2007 which included Christine Keshen, Linn Githmark, Debbie McCormick and Jackie Lockhart.

Curling
Arce played in the 2002, 2003 and 2004 European Curling Championships for Andorra. Skipping the team, she placed 17th, 15th and 21st respectively. In 2005, she moved to the Spanish team. Her international debut for Spain was at the 2005 European Mixed Curling Championship playing lead for Antonio De Mollinedo Gonzalez. Spain finished 16th. Her debut for Spain at the  happened a few months later. She played third for Ellen Kittelsen, and the team finished 17th.

At the 2007 European Mixed, she placed 21st on De Mollinedo's team. She would not play at the European Championships again until 2009, finishing 19th on Kittelsen's rink. In the meantime she placed 13th at the 2008 European Mixed and 9th at the 2009 event respectively. In 2008, the team was skipped by José Luis Hinojosa de Torres-Peralta and she was the team's female alternate. The 2009 team was skipped by De Mollinedo again.

References

1964 births
Living people
Spanish photographers
Andorran photographers
Spanish female curlers
Andorran female curlers
Spanish people of Andorran descent
People with acquired Andorran citizenship
Spanish women photographers